
Gmina Pilica is an urban-rural gmina (administrative district) in Zawiercie County, Silesian Voivodeship, in southern Poland.

Villages
Apart from the town of Pilica, Gmina Pilica contains the villages and settlements of Biskupice, Cisowa, Dobra, Dobra-Kolonia, Dobraków, Dzwono-Sierbowice, Dzwonowice, Jasieniec, Kidów, Kleszczowa, Kocikowa, Podleśna, Przychody, Siadcza, Sierbowice, Sławniów, Smoleń, Solca, Szyce, Wierbka, Wierzbica, Zarzecze and Złożeniec.

Neighbouring gminas
Gmina Pilica is bordered by the gminas of Klucze, Kroczyce, Ogrodzieniec, Szczekociny, Wolbrom and Żarnowiec.

References

Pilica
Zawiercie County